Timber Wars is a seven-part podcast hosted by Aaron Scott and produced by Oregon Public Broadcasting.

Background 
The show was produced by Oregon Public Broadcasting. The show discusses the conservation movement that took place in the Pacific Northwest in the 1990s. The show discusses the complicated conflict between environmentalists and loggers that occurred during the period known as the timber wars. The show discusses the history of logging and how forests were viewed as potential tree farms. Forester and dendrologists wanted to study and preserve old-growth forests, but were viewed negatively until the 1990s when large environmental protests began. At the same time, wildlife conservation for animals like the northern spotted owl became an issue. The show discusses a twenty-five year period of forestry and forest management. Aaron Scott is the host of the show—he grew up in Steamboat, Oregon not to far away from where the events of the show took place.

Episodes

Introductory episode

Season 1

Reception 
Nicholas Kristof of The New York Times commented on the show saying that "Listeners are left with both an appreciation of the magnificence of old growth forests and the toll paid by logging communities when those forests were protected. Environmentalists and loggers don't agree on much, but I think they will concur that 'Timber Wars' is fair and brilliant journalism."

Awards

References

External links 

 on NPR

2020 podcast debuts
2021 podcast endings
Audio podcasts
Science podcasts
American podcasts
Documentary podcasts
Environmental podcasts